Aleksandar Krstić aka Alex Krstic (Serbian Cyrillic: Александар Kpcтић; born 10 April 1962) is a Yugoslav (Serbian) football agent and a former footballer.

He played with Derry City F.C. in the League of Ireland and was the top goal-scorer in the 1986–87 League of Ireland First Division season with 18 goals.
Missed a penalty at the Estádio da Luz against Benfica in a European Cup tie in 1989.

Guested for Shamrock Rovers in a win over Manchester United in March 1987 at Glenmalure Park.

Krstic later moved to play in Germany with 1. FC Saarbrücken and then came back to France, He ended his career in Portugal. He lives in Montpellier since, operating as an agent for a number of footballers from or playing in France, as well as his native Serbia, including the likes of Stéphane Dalmat, El Hadji Diouf and Danijel Ljuboja.

References

External links
 The42 Article

1962 births
Living people
Footballers from Belgrade
Serbian footballers
Expatriate footballers in France
Ligue 2 players
Derry City F.C. players
League of Ireland players
League of Ireland XI players
Shamrock Rovers F.C. guest players
1. FC Saarbrücken players
F.C. Felgueiras players
Association football forwards